Pablo Rossi (born 5 April 1992) is an Argentine footballer who plays as a midfielder for Deportivo Pereira.

Career

Professional
Rossi began his career in the youth system of Atlético de Rafaela. In 2012, he was an unused substitute in a Copa Argentina games against Banfield, a 2–0 win for Atlético de Rafaela. The following year, he was also an unused substitute in another Copa Argentina game against eventual champions, San Lorenzo de Almagro.

On March 20, 2015, following a successful trial period, Rossi signed a professional contract with USL club Seattle Sounders FC 2.  He made his professional debut that same day in a 4–2 victory over Sacramento Republic FC, scoring once from a free-kick and assisting another.

In 2017, Rossi signed a contract with Deportivo Pereira to play the Categoría Primera B.

References

External links

1992 births
Living people
Footballers from Rosario, Santa Fe
Argentine footballers
Argentine expatriate footballers
Atlético de Rafaela footballers
Tacoma Defiance players
Association football midfielders
Expatriate soccer players in the United States
USL Championship players